Thomas Thynne, 2nd Marquess of Bath KG (25 January 1765 – 27 March 1837), styled Viscount Weymouth from 1789 until 1796, was a British peer.

Life

Early life 
Thynne was the eldest son of Thomas Thynne, 1st Marquess of Bath, and Lady Elizabeth Cavendish-Bentinck. He succeeded as 2nd Marquess in 1796 on the death of his father.

He was educated at Winchester College and admitted as a nobleman to St John's College, Cambridge in 1785, graduating M.A. in 1787.

Political career 
Between 1786 and 1790, he was MP (Tory) for Weobley. He later sat for Bath from 1790 to 1796. He was Lord Lieutenant of Somerset between 1819 and 1837 and was invested as a Knight of the Garter on 16 July 1823.

Later life and death 

He was a benefactor in the nearby town of Frome, giving up land and buildings so that a new wide road could be created leading south from the town centre, now called Bath Street. On another occasion he set aside land for allotments for a hundred families. "I have been told that at a certain hour in the morning he would admit the humblest persons in his parish, listen to their little concerns, and advise them.....He was one of the few who well understood for what purposes rank, wealth, and influence, are conferred."

Lord Bath died in 1837, aged 72, and was buried at his home, Longleat House. "I was told ten thousand were present, one hundred and fifty horsemen." His eldest son Thomas predeceased him by some two months and he was therefore succeeded by his second son Henry.

Marriage and progeny
Lord Bath married the Honourable Isabella Elizabeth Byng (21 September 1773 – 1 May 1830), daughter of George Byng, 4th Viscount Torrington, on 14 April 1794. They had eleven children:

 Lady Elizabeth Thynne (27 February 1795 – 16 February 1866); she married John Campbell, 1st Earl Cawdor on 5 September 1816. They had seven children.
 Thomas Thynne, Viscount Weymouth (9 April 1796 – 16 January 1837); he married Harriet Matilda Robbins on 11 May 1820.
 Henry Frederick Thynne, 3rd Marquess of Bath (4 May 1797 – 24 June 1837); he married Hon. Harriet Baring on 10 April 1830. They had four children.
 Lord John Thynne (7 November 1798 – 9 February 1881); he married Anne Beresford on 2 March 1824. They had nine children.
 Lady Louisa Thynne (25 March 1801 – 7 November 1859); she married Henry Lascelles, 3rd Earl of Harewood on 5 July 1823. They had thirteen children.
 Lord William Thynne (17 October 1803 – 30 January 1890); he married Belinda Brumel on 19 December 1861.
 Lord Francis Thynne (20 January 1805 – 29 May 1821)
 Lord Edward Thynne (23 January 1807 – 4 February 1884), married first Elizabeth Mellish and second Cecilia Anne Mary Gore, by whom he had issue.
 Lord George Thynne (25 December 1808 – 19 June 1832)
 Lady Charlotte Anne Thynne (10 April 1811 – 18 March 1895); she married Walter Montagu Douglas Scott, 5th Duke of Buccleuch on 13 August 1829. They had seven children.
 Reverend Lord Charles Thynne (9 February 1813 – 11 August 1894); he married Harriet Bagot on 18 July 1837. They had two children.

References

External links

1765 births
1837 deaths
People educated at Winchester College
Alumni of St John's College, Cambridge
Knights of the Garter
Lord-Lieutenants of Somerset
2
Thomas
Weymouth, Thomas Thynne, Viscount
Weymouth, Thomas Thynne, Viscount
British MPs 1784–1790
British MPs 1790–1796